Rajapaksa or Rajapakse is a Sinhalese surname. Notable people with the surname include:
 Rajapaksa family, Sri Lankan political dynasty
 Ajith Rajapakse (born 1974), Sri Lankan politician
 Basil Rajapaksa, (born 1951), Sri Lankan politician
 Chamal Rajapaksa (born 1942), Sri Lankan politician
 D. A. Rajapaksa (1905–1967), Ceylonese politician
 D. M. Rajapaksa, (1897–1945), Ceylonese politician
 George Rajapaksa (born 1926), Ceylonese politician
 Gotabhaya Rajapaksa (born 1949), Sri Lankan President
 Gunathilaka Rajapaksha (born 1957), Sri Lankan politician
 Lakshman Rajapaksa (born 1905), Ceylonese politician
 Mahinda Rajapaksa (born 1945), Sri Lankan President and Prime Minister
 Namal Rajapaksa (born 1986), Sri Lankan politician
 Nirupama Rajapaksa (born 1962), Sri Lankan politician
 Rohitha Rajapaksa (born 1989), Sri Lankan cricketer
 Shasheendra Rajapaksa, Sri Lankan politician
 Thilak Rajapaksha (born 1971), Sri Lankan politician
 Wijeyadasa Rajapakshe (born 1959), Sri Lankan lawyer and politician
 Yoshitha Rajapaksa (born 1988), Sri Lankan rugby union player
 Bhanuka Rajapaksa (born 1991), Sri Lankan cricketer
 Dayan Rajapakse (born 1972), Sri Lankan physician
 Lalitha Rajapakse (1900–1976), Ceylonese lawyer and politician
 Morris Rajapaksa (died 1995), Sri Lankan politician
 Nimal Rajapakshe, Canadian academic
 Somaratne Rajapakse, Sri Lankan soldier
 Suranimala Rajapaksha (born 1949), Sri Lankan politician

See also
 
 
 
 

Sinhalese surnames